Yacal may refer to:

 Yacal (tree), a Philippine timber tree with heavy hard wood.
 USS Yacal (YFB-688), a ferry that served in the United States Navy from 1932 to 1942.